The 2019 Nigerian Senate election in Ogun State held on February 23, 2019, to elect members of the Nigerian Senate to represent Ogun State. Ibikunle Amosun Oyelaja representing Ogun Central, Ramoni Olalekan Mustapha representing Ogun East, and Tolulope Akinyemi Odebiyi representing Ogun West all won on the platform of the All Progressives Congress.

Overview

Summary

Results

Ogun East 
A total of 22 candidates registered with the Independent National Electoral Commission to contest in the election. APC candidate Ramoni Olalekan Mustapha won the election, defeating PDP candidate Sosanwo Adeola Ayoola and 20 other party candidates. Ramoni of APC received 44.21% of the votes, while Sosanwa received 43.07%

Ogun Central 
A total of 19 candidates registered with the Independent National Electoral Commission to contest in the election. APC candidate Ibikunle Amosun Oyelaja won the election, defeating PDP candidate Solomon Abiodun Sanyaolu, ADC candidate Titilayo Oseni-Gomez and 16 other party candidates. Amosun of APC received 48.51% of the votes, Oseni-Gomez received 20.43% while Sanyaolu received 18.32%

Ogun West 
A total of 20 candidates registered with the Independent National Electoral Commission to contest in the election. APC candidate Tolu Odebiyi won the election, defeating PDP candidate Abiodun Odunleye Odunjo, APM candidate Bolanle Olusegun Gbeleyi and 17 other party candidates. Tolu of APC received 29.36% of the votes, while Odunjo received 22.60%

References 

Ogun State senatorial elections
2019 Ogun State elections